Thiago Henrique Marques Faria (born 7 October 1981), commonly known as Thiago Faria, is a retired Brazilian footballer.

Career statistics

Club

Notes

References

1989 births
Living people
Brazilian footballers
Brazilian expatriate footballers
Association football midfielders
S.C. Praiense players
S.C. Pombal players
Sport Benfica e Castelo Branco players
C.F. União players
Liga Portugal 2 players
Brazilian expatriate sportspeople in Portugal
Expatriate footballers in Portugal
Footballers from Belo Horizonte